Sally Starr (born Sarah Kathryn Sturm; January 23, 1909 – May 5, 1996) was an American theatrical and film actress known for her work during the 1920s and 1930s. A native of Pittsburgh, Pennsylvania, she was discovered while visiting the set of Ted Lewis's show as a teenager.

History
Born in Pittsburgh, Pennsylvania as Sarah Kathryn Sturm on January 23, 1909, she was a daughter of Harry and Sarah E. Sturm. As a toddler, she resided with her parents at the home of her paternal grandparents, Henry and Lotta Sturm, in Pittsburgh's 11th ward, where her father and grandfather were both hardware merchants and her paternal aunt was a school teacher. A decade later, she and her five-year-old brother, Raymond, were living with their parents at their own home in Pittsburgh's 10th ward. Her father was employed that year as a laundry superintendent.

While on a summer break from her studies at Pittsburgh's Peabody High School, she was sent to New York by her parents to visit her maternal grandmother, Mrs. Emma Imhoff, and was noticed as she spontaneously danced in the wings to the music of a Ted Lewis show rehearsal, having been invited to that rehearsal by a friend. Recruited by the show's director, she was subsequently chaperoned by her grandmother, who accompanied her as she toured with the Lewis show chorus. Freqeuently compared to Clara Bow, Sturm made her debut in Lewis' Frolics, and then also appeared in George White's Scandals of 1924. After making her move to Hollywood, she signed a contract with MGM.

While in Hollywood, she became better known as "Sally Starr," and performed leading roles in So This Is College (1929), The Woman Racket (1930), Not So Dumb (1930), Personality (1930), Pardon My Gun (1930) and For The Love o' Lil (1930). She was signed among the cast of Swing High (1930), a production of Pathe Pictures. Starr also continued her theatrical work after her motion picture career began, performing with Eleanor Powell and George Hassell in The Optimists, staged at the Century Roof Theater in January 1928. The same year she was cast with Elliott Nugent, Robert Montgomery, and Phyllis Crane in So This Is College. Her final films are Meet The Bride (1937), Getting An Eyeful (1938), Love and Onions (1938), and Money on Your Life (1938).

In 1958, Starr returned to the stage, performing in  Bemardine at the Pittsburgh Playhouse in June of that year.

Death and interment
Starr succumbed to heart disease at her home in South Park Township, Allegheny County, Pennsylvania on May 5, 1996. She was buried as "Sally (Mrs. John F.) Kovacevich" in the Garden of Devotion (lot 111-D, space 4) at Jefferson Memorial Park, which is located south of Pittsburgh in the community of Pleasant Hills, Pennsylvania.

Selected filmography
 The Man Trap (1917)
 The Flash of Fate (1918)
 Smashing Through (1918)
 So This Is College (1929)
 Personality (1930)
 For the Love o' Lil (1930)
 Swing High (1930)

References

External links

Further reading
Los Angeles Times, Juveniles Chosen For Swing High, February 13, 1930, Page A8.
Los Angeles Times, Sally Star Cast In Play, September 16, 1930, Page A9.
New York Times, Theatrical Notes, January 20, 1928, Page 14.
New York Times, New Films For Metro, June 16, 1929, Page X10.

1909 births
1996 deaths
American film actresses
American stage actresses
American silent film actresses
Western (genre) film actresses
20th-century American actresses
Metro-Goldwyn-Mayer contract players
Actresses from Pittsburgh